This is an index to articles about terms used in discussion of radio propagation.


A 
A-index -
active region -
Alfvén wave -
amateur radio bands -
anomalous propagation -
antenna height above average terrain -
Area-to-area Lee model -
American Radio Relay League (ARRL) -
atmospheric duct -
aurora -

B 
backscatter -
bow shock -
brightness temperature -
Broadcast range -
burst transmission -

C 
Cassegrain antenna -
celestial equator -
cellular telephony -
Chapman function -
clutter (radar) -
co-channel interference -
coherence bandwidth -
coherence time -
communication with submarines -
Computation of radiowave attenuation in the atmosphere -
Conder plot -
conjugate points -
corona -
coronagraph -
coronal hole -
coronal loops -
coronal mass ejection -
cosmic noise -
cosmic ray -
COST Hata model -
COST 231 model -
Coverage map -
Cp index -
Creeping wave -
critical frequency -
Critical hours -

D 
D region -
decibel -
delay spread -
Dellinger effect -
differential rotation -
dipole antenna -
directional antenna -
diurnal phase shift -
Diversity combining -
diversity scheme -
Doppler effect -
Doppler shift -
dose rate -
Dst index -
DXing -

E 
E region -
E-layer -
E-skip -
Early ITU model -
Earth bulge -
Earth–ionosphere waveguide -
Earth Observing System (EOS) -
Earth-Moon-Earth -
eclipse -
ecliptic -
Effective Earth radius -
Egli model -
electric beacon -
electrojet -
electromagnetic electron wave -
electrostatic discharge -
emission line -
ephemeris -
equatorial electrojet -
equinox -
Evershed effect -
exosphere -
expert system -
extraordinary mode -
extreme ultraviolet -
extremely high frequency -
extremely low frequency (ELF) -

F 
F region -
F-layer -
f-spot -
facula -
fade margin -
fading -
fading distribution -
filament (solar physics) -
flare (solar physics) -
flutter (electronics and communication) -
FM DX -
Forbush decrease -
forward scatter -
free space -
free-space path loss -
frequency of optimum transmission -
frequency-hopping spread spectrum -
Fresnel zone -
Friis transmission equation -

G 
gamma rays -
geomagnetic field -
geomagnetic storm -
geomagnetism -
geosynchronous -
Geostationary Meteorological Satellite (GMS) -
GMT -
Geostationary Operational Environmental Satellite (GOES) -
Ghosting (television) -
GPS -
Ground conductivity -
Ground plane -
ground wave -
group velocity -

H 
Hata model for open areas -
Hata model for suburban areas -
Hata model for urban areas -
heliosphere -
helmet streamer -
high frequency -
high latitude -
HRS type antennas -

I 
Interference (wave propagation) -
International Association of Geomagnetism and Aeronomy (IAG) -
International Cometary Explorer (ICE) -
International Geophysical Year (IGY) -
International Magnetospheric Study (IMS) -
intermediate-field region -
interplanetary magnetic field (IMF) -
interplanetary scintillation -
inversion (meteorology) -
ion-acoustic wave -
ionogram -
ionosphere -
ionospheric absorption -
ionospheric reflection -
ionospheric sounding -
ionospheric storm -
ITU model for indoor attenuation -
ITU terrain model -

K 
K-index -
Kelvin–Helmholtz instability -
Kennelly–Heaviside layer -
knife-edge effect -
Kp index -
Kitt Peak National Observatory (KPNO) -

L 
long-delayed echo (LDE) -
Line-of-sight propagation -
linear energy transfer (LET) -
Link budget -
Log-distance path loss model -
Longley–Rice model -
low frequency -
low probability of intercept -
low-gain antenna -
low-power communication device -
lowest usable frequency (LUF) -
lowest usable high frequency -

M 
magnetic cloud -
magneto-ionic double refraction -
magnetogram -
magnetohydrodynamics (MHD) -
magnetopause -
magnetosheath -
magnetosphere -
magnetotail -
material scattering -
Maunder minimum -
maximum usable frequency (MUF) -
Maxwell's equations -
medium frequency -
mesosphere -
meteor burst communications -
meteor scatter -
microwaves -
middle latitude -
Mie scattering -
Mie theory -
Miniprop -
Moreton wave -
Multipath interference -
Multipath propagation -
mush zone -
MW DX -

N 
National Bureau of Standards (NBS) -
National Center for Atmospheric Research (NCAR) -
Near Vertical Incidence Skywave -
National Geophysical Data Center (NGDC) -
National Institute of Standards and Technology (NIST) -
non-line-of-sight propagation -
National Solar Observatory (NSO) -

O 
Okumura model -
One woodland terminal model -
ordinary mode -

P 
path loss -
path profile -
path quality analysis -
penumbra -
perigee -
perihelion -
photosphere -
plasma -
plasma frequency -
plasmapause -
plasmasphere -
Point-to-point Lee model -
Polar mesospheric summer echoes -
power delay profile -
prominence -
Propagation path obstruction -
Propagation Graph -
pulse (signal processing) -

R 
radiation belt -
radiation scattering -
radio blackout -
Radio direction finder -
radio frequency -
radio horizon -
radio propagation -
radio propagation beacon -
radio propagation model -
Radio Society of Great Britain -
ray tracing (physics) -
Rayleigh fading -
Rayleigh–Taylor instability -
Rain fade -
relative transmission level -
RF planning -
Rician fading -
ring current -
riometer -
Radio Solar Telescope Network (RSTN) -

S 
Schumann resonance -
selective fading -
Shadow loss -
shortwave relay station -
side lobe -
Signal-to-Interference Ratio -
single event upset (SEU) -
Single vegetative obstruction model -
SINPO code -
skip (radio) -
skip zone -
sky wave -
skywave -
Solar Maximum Mission (SMM) -
Synchronous Meteorological Satellite (SMS) -
software-defined radio -
solar activity -
solar constant -
solar cycle -
solar flare -
solar flux -
solar flux unit -
solar maximum -
solar minimum -
solar radiation storm level -
solar rotation rate -
solar transition region -
solar wind -
solstice -
Solar Observing Optical Network (SOON) -
South Atlantic anomaly -
Southern Hemisphere Auroral Radar Experiment -
Space weather -
spicule (solar physics) -
SPLAT! -
Sporadic E propagation -
spray (solar physics) -
Spread spectrum -
stratosphere -
substorm -
sudden ionospheric disturbance (SID) -
sunspot -
sunspot cycle -
sunspot number -
super high frequency (SHF) -
supergranulation -
Surface wave -
Solar X-ray Imager (SXI) -
synodic -
synoptic chart -

T 
thermal fade -
thermosphere -
Time signal -
total electron content -
troposphere -
Tropospheric propagation -
tropospheric scatter -
tropospheric wave -
TV and FM DX -

U 
UHF -
UHF CB -
ultrahigh frequency -
ultraviolet -
umbra -
Union Radio Scientifique Internationale (URSI) -

V 
Van Allen radiation belts -
very high frequency -
very low frequency -
VOACAP -

W 
wave propagation -
Weibull fading -
Weissberger's model -
White Alice Communications System -
Wolf number -
WWV (radio station) -

X 
X band -
X-band -
X-ray -
X-ray background -
X-ray burst -

Y 
Young model -

Z 
Zeeman effect -

See also 
 List of radiation topics

External links 
 Noaa.gov

Radio frequency propagation topics